Trouble at Timpetill is a 2008 French fantasy adventure film written and directed by Nicolas Bary, based on the novel of the same name by Henry Winterfeld.

The film won the TFO Prize for Best Youth Film at the 2011 edition of the Cinéfranco.

Cast

 Raphaël Katz : Manfred
 Adèle Exarchopoulos : Marianne
 Léo Legrand : Thomas
 Gérard Depardieu : Général Igor
 Carole Bouquet : Drohne
 Armelle : Corbac
 Eric Godon : Butcher Stettner
 Baptiste Betoulaud : Oscar Stettner
 Lola Créton : Mireille Stettner
 Léo Paget : Robert Lapointe
 Terry Edinval : Wolfgang
 Florian Goutieras : P'tit Louis
 Mathieu Donne : Gros Paul
 Martin Jobert : Willy Hak
 Ilona Bachelier : Charlotte
 Julien Dubois : Barnabé
 Marcus Vigneron : Charles Benz
 Jonathan Joss : Jean Krög
 David Cognaux : Kevin
 Sacha Lecomte : Philibert
 Tilly Mandelbrot : Erna
 Maxime Riquier : Bobby le Scribe
 Manon Chevallier : Marion
 Valentine Bouly : Paulette
 Talina Boyaci : Zoé
 Vanille Ougen : Kimy
 Éric Naggar : Krögel
 Mayane Maggiori : Hak
 Odile Matthieu : Mistress Krog
 Isabelle de Hertogh : Edith Benz
 François Damiens : The delivery guy
 Philippe Le Mercier : The mayor
 Stéphane Bissot : Manfred's mother
 Thierry Desroses : l'abbé

References

External links
 

2008 films
French fantasy adventure films
2000s fantasy adventure films
Films based on German novels
2008 directorial debut films
2000s French-language films
2000s French films